Pierre-Clovis Beauchesne (8 June 1841 – 10 October 1918) was a Canadian politician.

Born in Bécancour, Canada East, the son of Pierre Bourbeau dit Beauchesne and Marie-Archange Pérenne de Moras (Archange Maurâce), Beauchesne was educated at Nicolet College and became a notary in 1865. He was a notary in Gaspésie and was a fish inspector. As well he was a customs collector from 1871 to 1874. He was elected to the Legislative Assembly of Quebec in an 1874 by-election in the electoral district of Bonaventure. A Conservative, he was re-elected in 1875. In 1876, the election was declared void and he did not run in the resulting by-election. In an 1879 by-election, he was elected to the House of Commons of Canada for the electoral district of Bonaventure. A Conservative, he did not run in 1882. He was a major in the Bonaventure Reserve Militia.

He died in Montreal in 1918 and was buried in Notre Dame des Neiges Cemetery.

References
 
 

1841 births
1918 deaths
Conservative Party of Canada (1867–1942) MPs
Members of the House of Commons of Canada from Quebec
Conservative Party of Quebec MNAs
People from Centre-du-Québec
Burials at Notre Dame des Neiges Cemetery